The following tables show state-by-state results in the Australian Senate at the 1996 federal election. Senators total 35 coalition (31 Liberal, three coalition National, one CLP), 29 Labor, two Green, two non-coalition National, seven Democrats, and one Independent. Senator terms are six years (three for territories), and took their seats from 1 July 1996, except the territories who took their seats immediately.

Australia

New South Wales

Victoria

Queensland

Western Australia

South Australia

Tasmania

Australian Capital Territory

Northern Territory

See also

Candidates of the 1996 Australian federal election
Members of the Australian Senate, 1996–1999

Notes

References

1996 elections in Australia
Senate 1996